Wellington North was a  federal electoral district represented in the House of Commons of Canada from 1867 to 1953. It was located in the province of Ontario.

It was created by the British North America Act, 1867 which divided the County of Wellington into North, South and Centre Ridings. The North Riding  consisted initially of the Townships of Amaranth, Arthur, Luther, Minto, Maryborough, Peel, and the village of Mount Forest.

In 1872, the township of Peel was removed from the riding, and the Village of Mount Arthur was added. In 1882, the riding was re-defined to consist of the townships of Wallace, Minto, Arthur, Luther East, Luther West and Amaranth, the towns of Palmerston, Harriston and Mount Forest, and the villages of Arthur and Clifford.

In 1903, the Wellington's three ridings were combined into two: the north and the south ridings of Wellington. The north riding consisted of the townships of Arthur, Garafraxa West, Luther West, Maryborough, Minto and Peel, the towns of Harriston, Mount Forest and Palmerston, and the villages of Arthur, Clifford and Drayton.

In 1924, the riding was called "Wellington North" and defined as consisting of that part of the county of Wellington lying north of a line described as commencing at the southeast corner of the township of Garafraxa West and following its southerly and westerly boundaries and the southerly boundary of the township of Peel, to the south boundary of Wellington county.

In 1933, it was defined as consisting of the townships of Arthur, Erin, Garafraxa West, Maryborough, Minto, Peel and West Luther in Wellington county, and the townships of Garafraxa East and East Luther in the county of Dufferin.  In 1947, it was defined to consist of the townships of Arthur, Erin, Garafraxa West, Maryborough, Minto, Peel and West Luther including the towns of Mount Forest and Palmerston in the county of Wellington, and the townships of Garafraxa East and Luther East in the county of Dufferin, but excluding the town of Orangeville.

The electoral district was abolished in 1952 when it was redistributed between Dufferin—Simcoe, Wellington South and Wellington—Huron ridings.

Members of Parliament

This riding elected the following members of the House of Commons of Canada:

Election results

|- 
  
|Liberal–Conservative
|George Alexander Drew  
|align="right"| 1,493 
 
|Unknown
|Michael Hamilton Foley
|align="right"|1,271

|- 
  
|Liberal
|Nathaniel Higinbotham 
|align="right"|1,264
  
|Liberal–Conservative
|George Alexander Drew  
|align="right"|1,204   
|}

|- 
  
|Liberal
|Nathaniel Higinbotham 
|align="right"|1,470
  
|Liberal–Conservative
|George Alexander Drew  
|align="right"|1,464    
|}

|- 
  
|Liberal
|Nathaniel Higinbotham 
|align="right"|1,368   
  
|Liberal–Conservative
|George Alexander Drew  
|align="right"|1,365 
|}

|- 
  
|Liberal–Conservative
|George Alexander Drew  
|align="right"| 1,713 
  
|Liberal
|Nathaniel Higinbotham 
|align="right"|  1,605   
|}

|- 
  
|Liberal
|James McMullen
|align="right"|1,911 
 
|Unknown
|J. B. Plumb
|align="right"|1,891 
|}

|- 
  
|Liberal
|James McMullen
|align="right"|2,543    
  
|Conservative
|Robert Gordon
|align="right"| 2,175   
|}

|- 
  
|Liberal
|James McMullen
|align="right"|2,486
  
|Conservative
|L. H. Clarke
|align="right"| 2,300   
|}

|- 
  
|Liberal
|James McMullen
|align="right"|2,712
  
|Conservative
|L. H. Clarke
|align="right"| 2,550    
|}

|- 
  
|Conservative
|Edwin Tolton
|align="right"|2,463 
  
|Liberal
|James McMullen
|align="right"|2,431   
|}

|- 
  
|Liberal
|Thomas Martin
|align="right"|2,849 
  
|Conservative
|John McGowan
|align="right"|2,541   
|}

|- 
  
|Liberal
|Alexander Munro Martin 
|align="right"|2,338 
  
|Conservative
|Alex Hamilton
|align="right"| 2,072   
|}

|- 
  
|Liberal
|Alexander Munro Martin
|align="right"|2,651
  
|Conservative
|William Aurelius Clarke
|align="right"|2,567   
|}

|- 
  
|Conservative
|William Aurelius Clarke
|align="right"|2,530
  
|Liberal
|Alexander Munro Martin
|align="right"|2,505   
|}

|- 
  
|Government (Unionist)
|William Aurelius Clarke
|align="right"|3,492    
  
|Opposition (Laurier Liberals)
|James McEwing
|align="right"|1,998   
|}

|- 

  
|Conservative
|William Aurelius Clarke
|align="right"|3,874   
|}

|- 
  
|Conservative
|Duncan Sinclair
|align="right"|4,152 

|}

|- 
  
|Conservative
|Duncan Sinclair
|align="right"|4,825 
  
|Liberal
|Richard Frederick Dale
|align="right"|4,452
|}

|- 
  
|Liberal
|John Knox Blair
|align="right"|4,716  
  
|Conservative
|Duncan Sinclair
|align="right"|4,626  
|}

|- 
  
|Liberal
|John Knox Blair
|align="right"|7,063  
  
|Conservative
|Duncas Sinclair
|align="right"|4,485 
  
|}

|- 
  
|Liberal
|John Knox Blair
|align="right"|5,748 
  
|National Government
|Lewis Menary
|align="right"| 4,266 
|}

|- 
1945/06/11 
  
|Progressive Conservative
|Lewis Menary
|align="right"| 5,779 
  
|Liberal
|Arnold Darroch
|align="right"| 5,764 
 
|Co-operative Commonwealth
|Harry Hall 
|align="right"|457   
|}

|- 
  
|Liberal
|Arnold Darroch
|align="right"|6,057 
  
|Progressive Conservative
|Lewis Menary 
|align="right"|6,025 
 
|Co-operative Commonwealth
|Frank J. Heffernan
|align="right"|  479  
|}

See also 

 List of Canadian federal electoral districts
 Past Canadian electoral districts

References

External links 

 Website of the Parliament of Canada

Former federal electoral districts of Ontario